Kadam, also Kardam or Kadamba, is clan of the Marathas, Kunbis and Kolis in some parts of Maharashtra, Karnataka, Andhra Pradesh, Telangana and Goa states of India.

See also
 Maratha clan system

References

Further reading 

Maratha clans
Koli clans